The {{nihongo|Kaidai-type submarine|海大型潜水艦|Kaidai-gata sensuikan}} was a type of first-class submarine operated by the Imperial Japanese Navy (IJN) before and during World War II. The type name was shortened to  Navy Large Type Submarine.

All Kaidai-class submarines originally had a two-digit boat name, from I-51 onwards. On 20 May 1942, all Kaidai submarines added a '1' to their names. For example, I-52 became I-152. Ships are listed by the three-digit boat name if they had one, two-digit if they were not granted one or left service before 20 May 1942.

Class variants
The Kaidai-type submarines were divided into seven classes and two subclasses:
 
 
 
 
 
 
 
 
 

Kaidai I (I-51 class)

Project number S22. The prototype for the class. The sole Kaidai I, I-51, was based on World War I-era German submarines. She was completed in 1924, refitted with new engines in 1932 and scrapped in 1941. I-51 never saw combat.
Boat in class

Kaidai II (I-152 class)

Project number S25. There was only 1 Kaidai II, I-152 planned under the Eight-six fleet together with the I-51. She was completed in 1924, used as a training vessel until mid-1942, then struck from service. She was scrapped in 1946. 
Boat in class

Kaidai IIIa/b (I-153 class and I-156 class)

Project number S26 (Kaidai IIIa) and S27 (Kaidai IIIb). The nine Kaidai IIIs were based on earlier designs, but featured a strengthened hull. The "IIIb" types were 40 cm longer and had a different bow design. All nine boats were constructed between 1927 and 1930.

Of the nine Kaidai IIIs, seven survived the war, as they spent much of their time as training vessels. These were scuttled or scrapped shortly after the end of World War II. I-63 was sunk in a collision with I-60 in 1939, the former losing all her crew. I-63 was refloated and scrapped in 1940.

Kaidai IV (I-61/162 class)

Project number S28. Slightly smaller than her predecessors and with only four torpedo tubes, three Kaidai IVs were constructed between 1929 and 1930; I-61, I-162, and I-164. I-61 was lost in a collision in 1941. I-162 survived the war.

Kaidai V (I-165 class)

Project number S29. Three Kaidai Vs were constructed; I-165, I-166, and I-67 which were all completed in 1932. The design saw the upgrade of the deck weapon from a 50 caliber to a 65-caliber long dual-purpose gun. The submarine was also slightly wider and taller, with an increased crew complement of 75 and an increased maximum depth of 230 ft (70 m). I-165 was modified in 1945, her gun removed and two Kaiten manned torpedo suicide attack craft substituted.

None of the Kaidai Vs survived World War II. I-67 was lost with all 87 crew during an exercise in 1940. I-165 was sunk on 27 June 1945, off the east coast of Saipan.  I-166 was sunk by the British submarine  on 17 July 1944, off the coast of Singapore.

Kaidai VIa/b (I-168 class and I-174 class)

Project number S31 (Kaidai VIa) and S34 (Kaidai VIb). They were built in 1931-34 under the 1st Naval Armaments Supplement Programme (Maru 1) and the 2nd Naval Armaments Supplement Programme (Maru 2) for the expansion of the Japanese navy. At 23 knots, this type had the fastest surface speed for any submarine at the time of construction, although the speed was bettered slightly by later Japanese submarines. I-174 and I-175 were of the Kaidai VIb sub-type. They were 30 cm longer, 25 tons heavier, and equipped with a 50 cal deck weapon instead of a 65 cal.

Kaidai VIs contributed to the sinking of two American aircraft carriers during World War II. The destruction of these submarines also hold some milestones; I-70 was Japan's first major warship casualty in World War II, and the sinking of I-73 represented the first warship kill by a United States Navy submarine in the war.

Boats in classes

Kaidai VII (I-176 class)

Project number S41. The final design in the Kaidai class, ten Kaidai VIIs were ordered in 1939 (I-176 I-185), and were completed over the course of 1942 and 1943. They were built in 1939 under the Maru 4 Programme. The IJN called  unofficially, and intended to replace this type with Kaidai III and Kaidai IV. Instead of possessing some aft-firing torpedo tubes as all other predecessors did, the Kaidai VII's six tubes all faced forward. They had an endurance of 75 days.

Seven of the ten Kaidai VIIs were sunk within their first year of operation and all ten vessels were sunk by October 1944.

Boats in class

Characteristics
{| class="wikitable" 
! width="15%" colspan="2"| Type
! width="16%" | Kaidai I (I-51)
! width="16%" | Kaidai II (I-152)
! width="16%" | Kaidai IIIa (I-153)
!width="16%" | Kaidai IIIb(I-156)
! width="16%" | Kaidai IV (I-61)
|-
! rowspan="2"|Displacement
! Surfaced
| 
| 
| 
| 
| 
|-
! Submerged
| 
| 
| 
| 
| 
|-
!colspan="2"| Length (overall)
| 
| 
| 
| 
| 
|-
!colspan="2"| Beam
| 
| 
| 
| 
| 
|-
! colspan="2"| Draft
| 
| 
| 
| 
| 
|-
! colspan="2"| Depth
| 
| 
| 
| 
| 
|-
! colspan="2"| Propulsion
| 4 × Sulzer Mk.2 diesels4 shafts
| 2 × Sulzer Mk 3 diesels2 shafts
| 2 × Sulzer Mk 3 diesels2 shafts
| 2 × Sulzer Mk 3 diesels2 shafts
| 2 × Rauschenbach Mk 2 diesels2 shafts
|-
! rowspan="2"|Power
! Surfaced
| 5,200 bhp
| 6,800 bhp
| 6,800 bhp
| 6,800 bhp
| 6,000 bhp
|-
! Submerged
| 2,000 shp
| 1,800 shp
| 1,800 shp
| 1,800 shp
| 1,800 shp
|-
| rowspan="2"|Speed
| Surfaced
| 
| 
| 
| 
| 
|-
| Submerged
| 
| 
| 
| 
| 
|-
| rowspan="2"|Range
| Surfaced
|  at 
|  at 
|  at 
|  at 
|  at 
|-
| Submerged
|  at 
|  at 
|  at 
|  at 
|  at 
|-
| colspan="2"| Test depth
| 
| 
| 
| 
| 
|-
! colspan="2"| Fuel
| 508 tons
| 284.5 tons
| 241.8 tons
| 230 tons
| 230 tons
|-
! colspan="2"| Complement
| 70
| 58
| 63
| 63
| 58
|-
! colspan="2"| Armament (initial)
| • 8 ×  TTs(6 × bow, 2 × aft)• 24 × 6th Year Type torpedoes• 1 ×  L/45 3rd Year Type Naval gun
| • 8 ×  TTs(6 × bow, 2 × aft)• 16 × 6th Year Type torpedoes• 1 ×  L/45 3rd Year Type Naval gun• 1 ×  L/23.5 AA gun
| • 8 ×  TTs(6 × bow, 2 × aft)• 16 × 6th Year Type torpedoes• 1 ×  L/40 11th Year Type Naval gun• 1 × 7.7 mm MG
| same as Kaidai IIIa
| • 6 ×  TTs(4 × bow, 2 × aft)• 14 × Type 89 torpedoes• 1 ×  L/40 11th Year Type Naval gun• 1 × 7.7 mm MG
|-
|}

Footnotes

References
 
, Gakken (Japan)
History of the Pacific War Vol. 17, I-Gō Submarines, January 1998, 
History of the Pacific War Vol. 63, Documents of IJN submarines and USN submarines, January 2008, 
History of the Pacific War Extra, Perfect guide, The submarines of the Imperial Japanese Forces, March 2005, 
Model Art Extra No.537, Drawings of Imperial Japanese Naval Vessels Part-3, Model Art Co. Ltd. (Japan), May 1999
The Maru Special, Ushio Shobō (Japan)
Japanese Naval Vessels No. 37, Japanese Submarines II, April 1980
Japanese Naval Vessels No. 132, Japanese Submarines I (New edition), February 1988
 Monthly Ships of the World,  (Japan)
 No. 469, Special issue Vol. 37, "History of Japanese Submarines", August 1993

Submarine classes
 
Submarines of the Imperial Japanese Navy